Thithikudhe is a 2003 Indian Tamil-language romantic drama film directed by Brinda Sarathy. It stars Jiiva and Sridevi Vijaykumar in the lead love roles. The film's score and music were composed by Vidyasagar. This film is the Tamil remake of the 2001 Telugu film Manasantha Nuvve. It tells the story of two childhood friends and how they reunite some time later. The film released on 1 August 2003. The film is also dubbed into Hindi as Agni Prem.

Plot
Chinnu and Anuradha (Anu) are childhood friends who live in a village. They always enjoy singing, dancing, playing and having fun with each other. Anu's father, who is a rich government official, gets transferred and relocates to another place with his family, which makes Anu lose contact with Chinnu. Before Anu leaves the village, she gifts a nice and beautiful musical watch to Chinnu as a token of her remembrance. Chinnu's mother passes away suddenly, and he is left alone. Chinnu is adopted by Chandramohan's family and gets renamed as Venu.

Venu is very attached to his adopted parents and looks after Chandramohan's music shop. Venu is in love with his childhood friend Anu, despite losing her contact with the hope of meeting her someday. Meanwhile, Anu's another name is Renu, and she too is in love with Chinnu with the same hope. Venu still preserves the musical watch gifted by Anu. Renu writes a story about her life (called Thithikudhe) in a weekly Ananda Vikadan magazine with the hope that Chinnu might read it and come to her.

Sruthi, a press reporter and the daughter of a magazine editor Sivaraman, is Venu's friend and she too falls in love with him after realising his good nature. One day, Venu's sister's engagement was cancelled due to a misunderstanding, so Venu and Chandramohan go for a drink. Venu asks Sruthi to help them to get home. Sruthi sees them but drops Venu at home only. As Venu is drunk, he unknowingly gifts the musical watch to Sruthi, thanking her.

The next day, Renu comes to a store and gets surprised upon seeing the watch with Sruthi. Renu feels happy that her hope of finding Chinnu is going to come true. Sruthi says that the watch was gifted by her lover Venu, which shocks Renu. Now, Renu learns that Chinnu is none other than Venu, but she feels bad that he has forgotten her and has decided to love Sruthi.

Venu realizes that he has missed the watch as he does not remember giving it to Sruthi. When he realises this, he meets Sruthi and apologizes, asking her to return the watch as it is preserved by him as a memory of his childhood friend Anu. Sruthi is worried upon knowing that Venu is indeed in love with Anu. During their next meet, Sruthi informs this to Renu, and Renu is excited upon now knowing that Venu is also sharing the same feeling as her. She found Venu at a TV stage show where she saw him singing their friendship song, 'Mainave Mainave'. However, Renu does not disclose that she is none other than his childhood friend Anu. She instead tries to befriend Venu as Renu and love him slowly.

Venu's sister is a very big fan of Renu's story that comes in the magazine. Venu gets introduced to Renu with the help of Sruthi as a writer. Knowing this, Venu requests Renu to visit his home and meet his sister so that she will feel excited. Renu agrees and comes to Venu's home. There, she meets Venu's adopted family and gets close with them.

Meanwhile, Anu's wedding is fixed with a minister's son by her father. Anu informs about her love to her father, for which he pretends accepting. However, he has other plans of stopping it. Venu's sister's wedding, who is Chandramohan's biological daughter's wedding, is also fixed during that time. One day, Venu reads the Thithikudhe story that has published in the Ananda Vikadan magazine and understands that Renu is, in fact, his childhood friend Anu. As Anu is away for a function, he waits for her return to propose his love towards her.

However, Anu's father meets Venu before that and asks him to go away from his daughter or else he will cause trouble during Venu's sister's wedding. Venu fears that his sister's life should not be spoiled because of him. He decides to sacrifice his love for his sister. When Anu arrives back, Venu meets her and hides his love and the real reason by lying that he is in love with another girl Renu, and there is no point in waiting for his childhood friend Anu. Anu, who was Renu, is shocked to hear this.

On the day of Venu's sister's wedding, Shruti records the real reason and tells Anu. She now knows that Venu knows that Renu is Anu before meeting her and obeyed her father to go away from her for the well-being of his sister, thereby understands that Venu's love for her was true. She now rushes to meet Venu. A few goons sent by her father and the minister also follow Anu, which results in a fight between Venu and the goons. Venu gets stabbed by a rowdy and is admitted to the hospital with severe injuries. Anu takes the idol of their favourite lord, “Hanuman”, to the hospital and prays for Venu's recovery. The musical watch falls from Venu's shirt pocket. Venu hears the watch's music. Then, he wakes up and sees Anu, whom he loved in his childhood days. Venu's adopted family and friends and Anu's family accept their love. They both reunite in the end.

Cast

Production
Trisha was initially approached to feature in the film, but the role was later handed to Sridevi Vijaykumar.

Soundtrack
The soundtrack was composed by Vidyasagar, and lyrics written by Vairamuthu. "Mainave Mainave" was a reused version of the composer's own Malayalam song "Kannadi Koodum" from Pranayavarnangal.

References

2003 films
Indian romantic drama films
Tamil remakes of Telugu films
2000s Tamil-language films
Films scored by Vidyasagar
2003 directorial debut films
2003 romantic drama films
Super Good Films films